LDF may refer to:

 Leaders For Democracy Fellows Program
 NAACP Legal Defense and Educational Fund
 Lesotho Defence Force
 Liberian Development Foundation
 Liechtenstein disclosure facility
 Lietuvos Darbo Federacija, the Lithuanian Labour Federation
 Liga Dominicana de Fútbol
 Local Defence Force, former Irish Army Reserve
 Log Database File extension, for Microsoft SQL Server
 Low-density fibreboard or particle board
 London dispersion force, type of intermolecular force
 Loss development factor in insurance pricing

Politics 

 Left Democratic Front, Kerala
 Left Democratic Front (Maharashtra), India